Intipanawin or Intipa Ñawin (Quechua inti sun, ñawi eye, -pa, -n suffixes, "eye of the sun", also spelled Intipanawin) is an archaeological site and the name of a mountain with rock paintings in Peru. Beside the painting of the eye of the sun there are also paintings of llamas nearby which draw the attention.

References 

Archaeological sites in Ancash Region
Archaeological sites in Peru
Rock art in South America
Mountains of Peru
Mountains of Ancash Region